The Berivotra Formation is a Maastrichtian sedimentary formation of the Mahajanga Basin in Boeny, Madagascar. The claystones of the formation were deposited in a shallow marine environment. The Berivotra Formation overlies the fossil-rich Maevarano Formation, in which more fossils of Beelzebufo, also recovered from the Berivotra Formation, have been found. Many shark and ray teeth were collected by surface prospecting on outcrops of the Berivotra Formation, which is readily distinguished by its yellowish grey to pale olive colour, as opposed to the white and green fluvial sandstones that form the  upper  of the underlying Maevarano Formation.

Fossil content 
The following fossils have been reported from the formation:

 Beelzebufo ampinga
 Cretolamna appendiculata, C. maroccana
 Serratolamna serrata
 Squalicorax kaupi, S. pristodontus
 Carcharias sp.
 Parapalaeobates sp.
 Pristiophorus sp.
 cf. Brachyrhizodus sp.

See also 
 List of fossiliferous stratigraphic units in Madagascar
 Geology of Madagascar

References

Further reading 
 M. D. Gottfried, J. A. Rabarison, and L. L. Randriamiarimanana. 2001. Late Cretaceous elasmobranchs from the Mahajanga Basin of Madagascar. Cretaceous Research 22:491-496

Geologic formations of Madagascar
Upper Cretaceous Series of Africa
Cretaceous Madagascar
Maastrichtian Stage
Shale formations
Shallow marine deposits
Paleontology in Madagascar
Formations